York, Pennsylvania could refer to:
 the city of York, Pennsylvania
 York, Pennsylvania metropolitan area
 York County, Pennsylvania
 York Haven, Pennsylvania
 York Springs, Pennsylvania

See also
 York Township, York County, Pennsylvania